18: Eighteen is the debut studio album by Nana Kitade.  It was originally released August 24, 2005 in Japan. The album peaked at #16 on the Oricon chart and charted for five weeks. On September 7, Kitade held a special one-man live show, which was titled Nana Kitade Live Showcase '18: Eighteen''', in Shibuya-Ax. First press editions of the album included a ticket to the live show and handshake event. On December 7, she released a DVD called Nana Kitade: 18Movies''. The DVD consists of all her music videos up until this point, clips from her one-man live show, commercials for her releases, and a studio recording of "Kesenai Tsumi". The album was released in the United States on July 11, 2006 through Tofu Records due to increased popularity overseas.

Track listing 

Notes
 "Utareru Ame" is titled "Break Out" on the U.S. Edition of the album.

Reception

Charts

Sales and certifications

References

External links
 Official Website Sony Music Japan

Nana Kitade albums
2005 albums